Erikson's stages of psychosocial development, as articulated in the second half of the 20th century by Erik Erikson in collaboration with Joan Erikson, is a comprehensive psychoanalytic theory that identifies a series of eight stages that a healthy developing individual should pass through from infancy to late adulthood. According to Erikson's theory the results from each stage, whether positive or negative, influences the results of succeeding stages. Erikson published a book called Childhood and Society in 1950 that made his research well known on the eight stages of psychosocial development. Erikson was originally influenced by Sigmund Freud's psychosexual stages of development. He began by working with Freud's theories specifically, but as he began to dive deeper into biopsychosocial development and how other environmental factors affect human development, he soon progressed past Freud's theories and developed his own ideas.

Erikson's stage theory characterizes an individual advancing through the eight life stages as a function of negotiating their biological and sociocultural forces. The two conflicting forces each have a psychosocial crisis which characterizes the eight stages. If an individual does indeed successfully reconcile these forces (favoring the first mentioned attribute in the crisis), they emerge from the stage with the corresponding virtue. For example, if an infant enters into the toddler stage (autonomy vs. shame and doubt) with more trust than mistrust, they carry the virtue of hope into the remaining life stages. The stage challenges that are not successfully overcome may be expected to return as problems in the future. However, mastery of a stage is not required to advance to the next stage. In one study, subjects showed significant development as a result of organized activities.

Stages

Hope: trust vs. mistrust (oral-sensory, infancy, under 1 year)

Existential Question: Can I Trust the World?

The first stage of Erik Erikson's theory centers around the infant's basic needs being met by the parents or caregiver and how this interaction leads to trust or mistrust. Trust as defined by Erikson is "an essential trustfulness of others as well as a fundamental sense of one's own trustworthiness." The infant depends on the parents, especially the mother, for sustenance and comfort. Infants will often use methods such as pointing to indicate their interests or desires to their parents or caregivers. The child's relative understanding of the world and society comes from the parents and their interaction with the child. Children first learn to trust their parents or a caregiver. If the parents expose their child to warmth, security, and dependable affection, the infant's view of the world will be one of trust. As the child learns to trust the world around them, they also acquire the virtue of hope. Should parents fail to provide a secure environment and to meet the child's basic needs; a sense of mistrust will result. Development of mistrust can later lead to feelings of frustration, suspicion, withdrawal, and a lack of confidence.

According to Erik Erikson, the major developmental task in infancy is to learn whether or not other people, especially primary caregivers, regularly satisfy basic needs. If caregivers are consistent sources of food, comfort, and affection, an infant learns trust — that others are dependable and reliable. If they are neglectful, or perhaps even abusive, the infant instead learns mistrust — that the world is an undependable, unpredictable, and possibly a dangerous place. Having some experience with mistrust allows the infant to gain an understanding of what constitutes dangerous situations later in life. However, infants and toddlers should not be subjected to prolonged situations of mistrust. This causes children to be ill adjusted later in life and see life with a cautious and careful outlook, which can be detrimental later in their life. In this stage, the child's most important needs are to feel safe, comforted, and well cared for.

This stage is where a child learns an attachment style to their caregiver. The attachment style the child develops can affect their relationships through the rest of their life. This concept was studied more by Bowlby and Ainsworth in their attachment theory which is consistent with Erikson's research.

Will: autonomy vs. shame/doubt (muscular-anal, toddlerhood, 1–2 years)
Existential Question: Is It Okay to Be Me?
As the child gains control over eliminative functions and motor abilities, they begin to explore their surroundings. Parents still provide a strong base of security from which the child can venture out to assert their will. The parents' patience and encouragement help to foster autonomy in the child. Children at this age like to explore the world around them and they are constantly learning about their environment. Caution must be taken at this age while children may explore things that are dangerous to their health and safety.

At this age, children develop their first interests. For example, a child who enjoys music may like to play with the radio. Children who enjoy the outdoors may be interested in animals and plants. Highly restrictive parents are more likely to instill in the child a sense of doubt, and reluctance to try new and challenging opportunities. As the child gains increased muscular coordination and mobility, toddlers become capable of satisfying some of their own needs. They begin to feed themselves, wash and dress themselves, and use the bathroom.

If caregivers encourage self-sufficient behavior, toddlers will develop a sense of autonomy—a sense of being able to handle many problems on their own. But if caregivers demand too much too soon, or refuse to let children perform tasks of which they are capable, or ridicule early attempts at self-sufficiency, children may instead develop shame and doubt about their ability to handle problems. There is definitely a delicate balance between letting the toddler have independence and autonomy concerning themselves, but the parent also has to be somewhat involved to make sure the child doesn't hurt or injure themselves. However, if the child receives too much autonomy, they have the potential to grow up with little concern for rules or regulations. But if the parents exert too much control over them, the child can grow up to be more rebellious and impulsive.

Purpose: initiative vs. guilt (locomotor-genital, early childhood, 3–6 years)
Existential Question: Is it Okay for Me to Do, Move, and Act?
Initiative adds to autonomy the quality of planning, undertaking, and attacking a task for the sake of just being active and on the move.  The child is learning to master the world around them, learning basic skills and principles of physics. Things fall down, not up, round things roll. They learn how to zip and tie, count and speak with ease. At this stage, the child wants to begin and complete their own actions for a purpose. Guilt is a confusing new emotion. They may feel guilty over things that logically should not cause guilt. They may feel guilt when this initiative does not produce desired results.

The development of courage and independence are what set preschoolers, ages three to six years of age, apart from other age groups. Young children in this category face the psychological crisis of initiative versus guilt. This includes learning how to face complexities of planning and developing a sense of judgment.  During this stage, the child learns to take initiative and prepares for leadership roles, and to achieve goals. Activities sought out by a child in this stage may include risk-taking behaviors, such as crossing a street alone or riding a bike without a helmet; both these examples involve self-limits. The child may also develop negative behaviors as they learn to take initiative. These negative behaviors, such as throwing objects, hitting, or yelling, can be a result of the child feeling frustrated after not being able to achieve a goal as planned.

Preschoolers are increasingly able to accomplish tasks on their own and can explore new areas. With this growing independence comes many choices about activities to be pursued. Sometimes children take on projects they can readily accomplish, but at other times they undertake projects that are beyond their capabilities or that interfere with other people's plans and activities. If parents and preschool teachers encourage and support children's efforts, while also helping them make realistic and appropriate choices, children develop initiative—independence in planning and undertaking activities. But if instead, adults discourage the pursuit of independent activities or dismiss them as silly and bothersome, children develop guilt about their needs and desires.

Competence: industry vs. inferiority (latency, late childhood, 7–10 years)
Existential Question: Can I Make it in the World of People and Things?
The aim of this stage is to bring a productive situation to completion which gradually supersedes the whims and wishes of play.
The fundamentals of technology are developed. The failure to master trust, autonomy, and industrious skills may cause the child to doubt their future, leading to shame, guilt, and the experience of defeat and inferiority.

The child must deal with demands to learn new skills or risk a sense of inferiority, failure, and incompetence. In doing so, children are able to start contributing to society and making a difference in the world. They become more aware of themselves and how competent, or not, they are.

"Children at this age are becoming more aware of themselves as individuals." They work hard at "being responsible, being good and doing it right." They are now more reasonable to share and cooperate. Allen and Marotz (2003) also list some perceptual cognitive developmental traits specific for this age group. Children grasp the concepts of space and time in more logical, practical ways. They gain a better understanding of cause and effect, and of calendar time. At this stage, children are eager to learn and accomplish more complex skills: reading, writing, telling time. They also get to form moral values, recognize cultural and individual differences and are able to manage most of their personal needs and grooming with minimal assistance. At this stage, children might express their independence by talking back and being disobedient and rebellious.

Erikson viewed the elementary school years as critical for the development of self-confidence. Ideally, elementary school provides many opportunities to achieve the recognition of teachers, parents and peers by producing things—drawing pictures, solving addition problems, writing sentences, and so on. If children are encouraged to make and do things and are then praised for their accomplishments, they begin to demonstrate industry by being diligent, persevering at tasks until completed, and putting work before pleasure. If children are instead ridiculed or punished for their efforts or if they find they are incapable of meeting their teachers' and parents' expectations, they develop feelings of inferiority about their capabilities.

Children also begin to make relationships with others around them. Being social is especially important for this stage. It helps school aged children become either more or less confident about themselves and their abilities. Also, during this age, children also begin to migrate into their own social groups. Depending on the child's "group", the child will have more or less self confidence.

At this age, children start recognizing their special talents and continue to discover interests as their education improves.  They may begin to choose to do more 
activities to pursue that interest, such as joining a sport if they know they have athletic ability, or joining the band if they are good at music.  If not allowed to discover their own talents in their own time, they will develop a sense of lack of motivation, low self-esteem, and lethargy.  They may become "couch potatoes" if they are not allowed to develop interests.

Fidelity: identity vs. role confusion (adolescence, 11-19 years)
Existential Question: Who Am I and What Can I Be?

The adolescent is newly concerned with how they appear to others. Superego identity is the accrued confidence that the outer sameness and continuity prepared in the future are matched by the sameness and continuity of one's meaning for oneself, as evidenced in the promise of a career. The ability to settle on a school or occupational identity is pleasant. In later stages of adolescence, the child develops a sense of sexual identity. Adolescents become curious about the roles they will play in the adult world as they transition from childhood to adulthood. Initially, they are apt to experience some role confusion—mixed ideas and feelings about the specific ways in which they will fit into society—and may experiment with a variety of behaviors and activities (e.g. tinkering with cars, baby-sitting for neighbors, affiliating with certain political or religious groups). Eventually, Erikson proposed, most adolescents achieve a sense of identity regarding who they are and where their lives are headed.

The teenager must achieve identity in occupation, gender roles, politics, and, in some cultures, religion. This is not always easy, however. The teenager must seek to find their place in this world and to find out how they can contribute to the world.

Erikson is credited with coining the term "identity crisis". He describes identity crisis as a critical part of development in which an adolescent or youth develops a sense of self. Identity crisis involves the integration of the physical self, personality, potential roles and occupations. It is influenced by culture and historical trends. This stage is necessary for the successful development of future stages. Each stage that came before and that follows has its own 'crisis', but even more so now, for this marks the transition from childhood to adulthood. This passage is necessary because "Throughout infancy and childhood, a person forms many identifications. But the need for identity in youth is not met by these." This turning point in human development seems to be the reconciliation between 'the person one has come to be' and 'the person society expects one to become'. This emerging sense of self will be established by 'forging' past experiences with anticipations of the future. In relation to the eight life stages as a whole, the fifth stage corresponds to the crossroads:

What is unique about the stage of Identity, is that it is a special sort of synthesis of earlier stages and a special sort of anticipation of later ones. Youth has a certain unique quality in a person's life; it is a bridge between childhood and adulthood. Youth is a time of radical change—the great body changes accompanying puberty, the ability of the mind to search one's own intentions and the intentions of others, the suddenly sharpened awareness of the roles society has offered for later life.

Adolescents "are confronted by the need to re-establish boundaries for themselves and to do this in the face of an often potentially hostile world". This is often challenging since commitments are being asked for before particular identity roles have formed. At this point, one is in a state of 'identity confusion', but society normally makes allowances for youth to "find themselves", and this state is called 'the moratorium':

The problem of adolescence is one of role confusion—a reluctance to commit which may haunt a person into his mature years. Given the right conditions—and Erikson believes these are essentially having enough space and time, a psychosocial moratorium, when a person can freely experiment and explore—what may emerge is a firm sense of identity, an emotional and deep awareness of who they are.

As in other stages, bio-psycho-social forces are at work. No matter how one has been raised, one's personal ideologies are now chosen for oneself. Often, this leads to conflict with adults over religious and political orientations. Another area where teenagers are deciding for themselves is their career choice, and often parents want to have a decisive say in that role. If society is too insistent, the teenager will acquiesce to external wishes, effectively forcing him or her to ‘foreclose' on experimentation and, therefore, true self-discovery. Once someone settles on a worldview and vocation, will they be able to integrate this aspect of self-definition into a diverse society? According to Erikson, when an adolescent has balanced both perspectives of "What have I got?" and "What am I going to do with it?" they have established their identity:

Dependent on this stage is the ego quality of fidelity—the ability to sustain loyalties freely pledged in spite of the inevitable contradictions and confusions of value systems. (Italics in original)

Leaving past childhood and facing the unknown of adulthood is a component of adolescence. Another characteristic of this stage is moratorium which tends to end as adulthood begins. Given that the next stage (Intimacy) is often characterized by marriage, many are tempted to cap off the fifth stage at 20 years of age. However, these age ranges are actually quite fluid, especially for the achievement of identity, since it may take many years to become grounded, to identify the object of one's fidelity, to feel that one has "come of age". In the biographies Young Man Luther and Gandhi's Truth, Erikson determined that their crises ended at ages 25 and 30, respectively:

Erikson does note that the time of Identity crisis for persons of genius is frequently prolonged. He further notes that in our industrial society, identity formation tends to be long, because it takes us so long to gain the skills needed for adulthood's tasks in our technological world. So… there is not exact time span in which to find oneself. It does not happen automatically at eighteen or at twenty-one. A very approximate rule of thumb for our society would put the end somewhere in one's twenties.

Love: intimacy vs. isolation (early adulthood, 20–45 years)
Existential Question: Can I Love?
The Intimacy versus Isolation conflict occurs following adolescence.  At the start of this stage, identity versus role confusion is coming to an end, although it still lingers at the foundation of the stage.  Young adults are still eager to blend their identities with those of their friends because they want to fit in. Erikson believes that people are sometimes isolated due to intimacy.  People are afraid of rejections such as being turned down or their partners breaking up with them. Human beings are familiar with pain, and to some people, rejection is so painful that their egos cannot bear it. Erikson also argues that distantiation occurs with intimacy. Distantiation is the desire to isolate or destroy things that may be dangerous to one's own ideals or life. This can occur if a person has their intimate relationship invaded by outsiders.

Once people have established their identities, they are ready to make long-term commitments to others. They become capable of forming intimate, reciprocal relationships (e.g. through close friendships or marriage) and willingly make the sacrifices and compromises that such relationships require. Those in more advanced stages of identity development are often associated with greater success pertaining to intimacy formation. If people cannot form these intimate relationships—perhaps because of their own needs—then a sense of isolation may result, thereby arousing feelings of darkness and angst.

Care: generativity vs. stagnation (middle adulthood, 45–64 years)
Existential Question: Can I Make My Life Count?
Generativity is the concern of guiding the next generation. Socially-valued work and disciplines are expressions of generativity.

The adult stage of generativity has broad application to family, relationships, work, and society. "Generativity, then is primarily the concern in establishing and guiding the next generation... the concept is meant to include... productivity and creativity."

During middle age, the primary developmental task is one of contributing to society and helping to guide future generations. When a person makes a contribution during this period, perhaps by raising a family or working toward the betterment of society, a sense of generativity—a sense of productivity and accomplishment—results. In contrast, a person who is self-centered and unable or unwilling to help society move forward develops a feeling of stagnation—a dissatisfaction with the relative lack of productivity.

Central tasks of middle adulthood
Express love through more than sexual contacts.
 Maintain healthy life patterns.
 Develop a sense of unity with mate.
 Help growing and grown children to be responsible adults.
 Relinquish central role in lives of grown children.
 Accept children's mates and friends.
 Create a comfortable home.
 Be proud of accomplishments of self and mate/spouse.
 Reverse roles with aging parents.
 Achieve mature, civic and social responsibility.
 Adjust to physical changes of middle age.
 Use leisure time creatively.

Wisdom: ego integrity vs. despair (late adulthood, 65 years and above)
Existential Question: Is it Okay to Have Been Me?
As people grow older and become senior citizens, they tend to slow down their productivity and explore life as a retired person. Factors such as leisure activities and family involvement play a significant role in the life of a retiree and their adjustment to living without having to perform specific duties each day pertaining to their career. Even during this stage of adulthood, however, they are still developing. The association between aging and retirement can bring about a reappearance of bipolar tensions of earlier stages in Erikson's model, meaning that aspects of previous life stages can reactivate because of the onset of aging and retirement. Development at this stage also includes periods of reevaluation regarding life satisfaction, sustainment of active involvement, and developing a sense of health maintenance. Developmental conflicts may arise in this stage, but psychological growth in earlier stages can help significantly in resolving these conflicts.

It is during this time that they contemplate their accomplishments and evaluate the person that they have become. They are able to develop integrity if they see themselves as leading a successful life. Those that have developed integrity perceive that their lives have meaning. They tend to feel generally satisfied and accept themselves and others. As they near the end of their lives, they are more likely to be at peace about death. If they see their life as unproductive or feel that they did not accomplish their life goals, they become dissatisfied with life and develop despair. This can often lead to feelings of depression and hopelessness. They may also feel that life is unfair and be fearful of dying.

During this time there may be a renewal in interest in many things. This is believed to occur because the individuals in this time of life strive to be autonomous. As their bodies and minds start to deteriorate, they want to find a sense of balance. They will cling to their autonomy so that they will not need to be reliant on others for everything. Erikson explains that it is also important for adults in this stage to maintain relationships with others of different ages in order to develop integrity.

The final developmental task is retrospection: people look back on their lives and accomplishments. Practices such as narrative therapy can help individuals reinterpret their minds pertaining to their past and allow them to focus on the brighter aspects of their lives. They develop feelings of contentment and integrity if they believe that they have led a happy and productive life. If they look back on a life of disappointments and unachieved goals, they may instead develop a sense of despair.

This stage can occur out of the sequence when an individual feels they are near the end of their life (such as when receiving a terminal disease diagnosis).

Ninth stage
Psychosocial Crises: All first eight stages in reverse quotient order
Joan Erikson, who married and collaborated with Erik Erikson, added a ninth stage in The Life Cycle Completed: Extended Version. Living in the ninth stage, she wrote, "old age in one's eighties and nineties brings with it new demands, reevaluations, and daily difficulties". Addressing these new challenges requires "designating a new ninth stage". Erikson was ninety-three years old when she wrote about the ninth stage.

Joan Erikson showed that all the eight stages "are relevant and recurring in the ninth stage". In the ninth stage, the psychosocial crises of the eight stages are faced again, but with the quotient order reversed. For example, in the first stage (infancy), the psychosocial crisis was "Trust vs. Mistrust" with Trust being the "syntonic quotient" and Mistrust being the "dystonic". Joan Erikson applies the earlier psychosocial crises to the ninth stage as follows:

"Basic Mistrust vs. Trust: Hope"
In the ninth stage, "elders are forced to mistrust their own capabilities" because one's "body inevitably weakens". Yet, Joan Erikson asserts that "while there is light, there is hope" for a "bright light and revelation".

"Shame and Doubt vs. Autonomy: Will"
Ninth stage elders face the "shame of lost control" and doubt "their autonomy over their own bodies". So it is that "shame and doubt challenge cherished autonomy".

"Inferiority vs. Industry: Competence"
Industry as a "driving force" that elders once had is gone in the ninth stage. Being incompetent "because of aging is belittling" and makes elders "like unhappy small children of great age".

"Identity confusion vs. Identity: Fidelity"
Elders experience confusion about their "existential identity" in the ninth stage and "a real uncertainty about status and role".

"Isolation vs. Intimacy: Love"
In the ninth stage, the "years of intimacy and love" are often replaced by "isolation and deprivation". Relationships become "overshadowed by new incapacities and dependencies".

"Stagnation vs. Generativity: Care"
The generativity in the seventh stage of "work and family relationships", if it goes satisfactorily, is "a wonderful time to be alive". In one's eighties and nineties, there is less energy for generativity or caretaking. Thus, "a sense of stagnation may well take over".

"Despair and Disgust vs. Integrity: Wisdom"
Integrity imposes "a serious demand on the senses of elders". Wisdom requires capacities that ninth stage elders "do not usually have". The eighth stage includes retrospection that can evoke a "degree of disgust and despair". In the ninth stage, introspection is replaced by the attention demanded to one's "loss of capacities and disintegration".

Living in the ninth stage, Joan Erikson expressed confidence that the psychosocial crisis of the ninth stage can be met as in the first stage with the "basic trust" with which "we are blessed".

Development of post-Freudian theory
Erikson was a student of Anna Freud, the daughter of Sigmund Freud, whose psychoanalytic theory and psychosexual stages contributed to the basic outline of the eight stages, at least those concerned with childhood. Namely, the first four of Erikson's life stages correspond to Freud's oral, anal, phallic, and latency phases, respectively. Also, the fifth stage of adolescence is said to parallel the genital stage in psychosexual development:

Although the first three phases are linked to those of the Freudian theory, it can be seen that they are conceived along very different lines. Emphasis is not so much on sexual modes and their consequences, but on the ego qualities which emerge from each of the stages. There is an attempt also to link the sequence of individual development to the broader context of society.

Erikson saw a dynamic at work throughout life, one that did not stop at adolescence. He also viewed the life stages as a cycle: the end of one generation was the beginning of the next. Seen in its social context, the life stages were linear for an individual but circular for societal development:

In Freud's view, development is largely complete by adolescence. In contrast, one of Freud's students, Erik Erikson (1902–1994) believed that development continues throughout life. Erikson took the foundation laid by Freud and extended it through adulthood and into late life.

Criticism

One major criticism of Erikson's theory of psychosocial development is that it primarily describes the development of European or American males. Erikson's theory may be questioned as to whether his stages must be regarded as sequential, and only occurring within the age ranges he suggests. There is debate as to whether people only search for identity during the adolescent years or if one stage needs to happen before other stages can be completed. However, Erikson states that each of these processes occur throughout the lifetime in one form or another, and he emphasizes these "phases" only because it is at these times that the conflicts become most prominent.

Most empirical research into Erikson has related to his views on adolescence and attempts to establish identity. His theoretical approach was studied and supported, particularly regarding adolescence, by James E. Marcia. Marcia's work has distinguished different forms of identity, and there is some empirical evidence that those people who form the most coherent self-concept in adolescence are those who are most able to make intimate attachments in early adulthood. This supports the part of Eriksonian theory, that suggests that those best equipped to resolve the crisis of early adulthood are those who have most successfully resolved the crisis of adolescence.

Another criticism of Erikson's theory of psychosocial development is that he does not go into detail about what causes these stages of development or how they are resolved. There is little information stated about the experiences that result in how a person develops at each stage. Just as there are vague details about the causes of each seory does not outline the necessary steps to resolve conflict in order to enter the next stage.

See also

 Child development
 Developmental psychology
 Ethnic identity development
 Kohlberg's stages of moral development
 Neo-Freudianism
 Positive disintegration

References

Sources

Publications 
 Erikson, E. (1950). Childhood and society (1st ed.). New York: Norton 
 Erikson, Erik H. (1959) Identity and the Life Cycle. New York: International Universities Press.
 Erikson, Erik H. (1968) Identity, Youth and Crisis. New York: Norton.
 
 Sheehy, Gail (1976) Passages: Predictable Crises of Adult Life. New York: E. P. Dutton.
 Stevens, Richard (1983) Erik Erikson: An Introduction. New York: St. Martin's.

Developmental stage theories
Psychoanalysis